The New Adventures of Huckleberry Finn is an American live-action and animated fantasy television series that originally aired on NBC from September 15, 1968, through February 23, 1969. Produced by Hanna-Barbera and based on the classic Mark Twain characters, the program starred its three live-action heroes, Huck Finn (Michael Shea), Becky Thatcher (LuAnn Haslam), and Tom Sawyer (Kevin Schultz), navigating weekly adventures within an animated world as they attempted to outrun a vengeful "Injun Joe" (voiced by Ted Cassidy). After the show's original run, the series continued to air in reruns as part of The Banana Splits and Friends Show syndication package.

Production
In February 1967, Hanna-Barbera Productions announced it was in the process of developing a record number of six new animated television series.  According to the Los Angeles Times, the six new series in various stages of production at the time were Moby Dick and Mighty Mightor, Zartan (a.k.a. The Herculoids), Shazzan, Samson & Goliath, Fantastic Four and The New Adventures of Huckleberry Finn.  Also nearing the end of post-production at the time was Hanna-Barbera's Jack and the Beanstalk, an hour-long special which featured Gene Kelly dancing alongside various cartoon characters and aired on February 26, 1967.  In a 2005 interview, LuAnn Haslam stated that Jack and the Beanstalk had served as a "trial run" for the technology of combining live-action with animation, saying, "NBC had to be convinced that combining people with cartoon figures would work. It was a big success and so NBC went forward with our series."

At the time of production, The New Adventures of Huckleberry Finn was the first weekly television series to combine live-action performers and animation.  During development of the series, William Hanna and Joseph Barbera also stated the show was to be the most expensive half hour ever put on television.  In a July 1967 interview with columnist Hal Humphrey, William Hanna expressed high hopes for the innovative new concept, saying "When you say the word 'cartoon', people think of children only, and we limit ourselves – although plenty of adults watch cartoons.  We think combining the live action with the animation will give our company a special identification," with Joseph Barbera adding, "And do you know the clothes from that period are 'mod' today?  The kids are wearing the same high-gaiter shoes now that Huck and Tom wore then."

After NBC green-lit the series, preparations began to find the youngsters to portray the series' three leads.  In 2005, Haslam recalled the casting process, saying "(T)he show was produced by both Hanna-Barbera and NBC. As a result there were a lot of people to make happy when it came to choosing the cast. As I understand it, Hanna-Barbera cast the show and sent some kind of screen test/pilot to the NBC executives in New York. NBC didn't like the choices that had been made. They decided that they wanted the cast to be younger. So Hanna-Barbera had to start all over again."  In casting their lead, Hanna-Barbera and NBC eventually found their ideal "Huck" in 14-year-old veteran child actor Michael Shea, reportedly selecting him out of 1,300 boys.  14-year-old newcomer LuAnn Haslam was chosen to play "Becky".  In recounting how she landed the role, Haslam stated, "I got a call from my agent to go to Hanna-Barbera for an interview. Carmen Sanchez was the casting director. As I walked into her office she was on the telephone. She turned, looked at me and said to the person on the telephone, 'I have to go, Becky just walked in.'"

Rounding out the series live-action cast was 13-year-old Kevin Schultz who was cast as "Tom". At the time, Schultz was best known for starring on the television western series The Monroes alongside his twin brother Keith, who had reportedly also auditioned for the role of "Tom" before Kevin was selected.

Character actor Ted Cassidy was cast to voice the role of the animated antagonist "Injun Joe".  In an August 1967 interview with columnist Mel Heimer, Cassidy stated that he was looking forward to his upcoming role on the new series, saying, "I think I'll get more of a chance to do some acting than I did in (The Addams Family)."

With the series' three young live-action stars in place, the complicated filming process began.  During the months the series was in production, each day of filming reportedly began at 9:00 a.m.  Under California law at the time, child actors were required to attend school for three hours a day and periods of instruction had to last at least 20 minutes at a time. When asked about the filming process, Michael Shea described an average day on the set, saying, "First we'd get made-up and dressed, and then we'd go to school while the shot was being set up.  By coincidence, we were all taking the exact same subjects, so we were tutored together."

The live actors' scenes were filmed in front of a royal blue backdrop (an early forerunner to the modern-day CGI green screen) and the cartoon background and characters were animated in later. Working with a technology still in its infancy, the young cast was required to master the art of engaging in conversational exchanges without having their animated co-stars to interact with. Shea recalled, "Injun Joe, for instance, was a cartoon character, so when I had to talk to him, I'd run my eyes slowly up the blue screen until the director told me to stop.  Then I'd just try to remember where that point on the screen was." Since the voice actors would not record their audio tracks until after principal filming was completed, character actor Bruce Watson, whom Shea described as "the greatest dialogue coach in the world", would perform the lines of all the animated characters during filming for the live-action stars to interact with. Each episode reportedly took approximately 4 hours to film and six months to animate.

Premise
The pilot episode opens with a live-action prologue which sets the premise for the series.  It is late afternoon in Hannibal, Missouri, and Twain's classic characters, Aunt Polly (Tom's aunt) and Mrs. Thatcher (Becky's mother) appear distressed in their concern for the youngsters, who are said to be late arriving home.  Next, we see our three protagonists, Huckleberry Finn (Michael Shea), Becky Thatcher (LuAnn Haslam) and Tom Sawyer (Kevin Schultz) taking a shortcut home through the town's graveyard, where they encounter "Injun Joe" (Ted Cassidy).  Furious at the two boys for testifying in court to seeing him murder Doctor Robinson, Injun Joe chases the three children into McDougal's Cave.  As the spry children outrun him, an angry Injun Joe vows revenge, calling out to them  "You'll never get away from me!  No matter where you go, I'll find you!"  Once inside, however, the three youngsters find themselves hopelessly lost in the cave's labyrinthine passageways. This prologue would be re-edited with a voice-over by Michael Shea as Huck Finn summarizing the events, and would serve as the opening sequence for each subsequent episode.

Although we never see the three youngsters emerge from the cave, it is presumed that they eventually find a way out since, as each episode proper begins, we join our three young live-action heroes as they now inhabit an animated world.  Throughout the series, the children embark on a quest to return to their families in Hannibal, Missouri, traveling to various exotic animated lands (tropical islands; Egyptian deserts; Aztec cities; etc.) and make friends with—or run afoul of—an array of fanciful animated characters (leprechauns; pirates; sorcerers; etc.).  Every episode also features an evil animated antagonist who bears an uncanny resemblance to Injun Joe (voiced by Cassidy).  The likeness is not lost on the three children, who are routinely startled by the striking similarity to their nemesis back home; however, no explanation is offered of how, or why, Injun Joe is constantly able to remain one step ahead of them and assume these various guises.  As the series only lasted one season, an episode explaining how, or if, the three children ever make it back home, or if it may, in fact, all be some sort of surrealistic "dream", is never seen.

Cast

Starring
 Michael Shea as Huckleberry Finn
 LuAnn Haslam as Becky Thatcher
 Kevin Schultz as Tom Sawyer
 Ted Cassidy as Injun Joe
 Dorothy Tennant as Mrs. Thatcher
 Anne Bellamy as Aunt Polly

Reception
In a departure from the networks' traditional cartoon time-slots, which were most commonly afternoons after school or Saturday mornings, the series premiered in its 7:00 p.m. Sunday night time-slot (or 6:00 p.m. depending on the time zone) on September 15, 1968.  Initial reaction was generally positive, with critics praising Hanna-Barbera's technique of combining live-action with animation as well as the performances of the show's three young leads.  While acknowledging the series bore little resemblance to the original Twain stories, Milwaukee Journal critic Wade Mosby felt the series would be enjoyable for its target audience, describing the series' three young leads as "engaging" and continuing, "There's lots of activity, some thrills and chuckles and (aside from the introduction) not too much violence."

The Newburgh Evening News also expected the show to be popular with children, writing, "The younger set will love this show." and continuing the following week, "(T)he combined animation–live action techniques are excellent", as well as singling out young Haslam as "a charming scene stealer."  However, Telegram News Service critic Kathy Brooks expressed disappointment in Hanna-Barbera's handling of the beloved Twain characters writing, "Shame on Hanna-Barbera.  They've taken the characters, and in reverse Twain tradition, white-washed them into fine upstanding citizens with no deviltry, and no charming original thoughts.  Michael Shea plays Huck, and a more freshly-scrubbed looking Huck would be hard to find; Kevin Schultz plays Tom, and ditto for him. [...] No parent worth his salt should let his offspring think the TV version is the real Twain, or the real Becky or Tom or Huck."

As a Sunday evening show, the series garnered a wider audience than Saturday morning cartoons of the time, and launched its three attractive young stars as popular teen idols of the day.  The series aired in over 15 countries and its three young leads were routinely in demand to make celebrity appearances to meet with young fans across the United States during the show's original run.  During this time, the series also inspired a comic book adaptation.  In December 1968, Gold Key Comics published a one-issue The New Adventures Of Huck Finn comic book, based on the episode "The Curse Of Thut" which aired around the same time.  Although popular with child and teenage audiences, the series struggled in the ratings against its Sunday night competition (Land of the Giants on ABC and Lassie on CBS), by the end of 1968, news sources were already reporting that a second season appeared unlikely.

The final original episode aired on February 23, 1969, with NBC continuing to air the show in reruns through the fall of that year, ultimately replacing it with Wild Kingdom on September 14, 1969.  After the show's cancellation, the series was repackaged into syndication as part of The Banana Splits and Friends Show.  Although originally airing in an hour-long format as a Saturday morning show called The Banana Splits Adventure Hour, subsequent incarnations were re-edited and sold into syndication as half-hour episodes which included several series not originally part of the original show.  As part of The Banana Splits, The New Adventures of Huckleberry Finn enjoyed new life, becoming well known to subsequent generations for the next four decades.

List of episodes

Home media
On June 28, 2016, Warner Archive released The New Adventures of Huckleberry Finn: The Complete Series on DVD in Region 1 for the very first time.  This is a Manufacture-on-Demand (MOD) release, available exclusively through Warner's online store and Amazon.com.

See also
The Adventures of Tom Sawyer
Adventures of Huckleberry Finn
The Banana Splits

References

External links
 
 The New Adventures of Huckleberry Finn at the Big Cartoon DataBase
 The New Adventures of Huckleberry Finn at Toontracker.com
 Interview with LuAnn Haslam at Kiddiematinee.com
 Interview with Michael Shea at Google News

NBC original programming
1960s American animated television series
American children's animated adventure television series
American children's animated fantasy television series
1968 American television series debuts
1969 American television series endings
Television shows based on American novels
Television series by Hanna-Barbera
Television shows based on works by Mark Twain
English-language television shows
American television series with live action and animation
American television shows based on children's books
Animated television series about orphans
Works based on Adventures of Huckleberry Finn